The Metrolina Library Association exists to connect and sharpen Charlotte, North Carolina area library professionals. The MLA was established in 1969 and continues to be active in the Charlotte community.  It is open to anyone affiliated with or interested in libraries in the twelve county "metrolina" area of Cabarrus, Catawba, Cleveland, Gaston, Iredell, Lincoln, Mecklenburg, Rowan, Stanly and Union counties in North Carolina and York and Lancaster counties in South Carolina.

In 1986 the Metrolina Library Association was merged with the Mecklenburg Library Association, keeping the MLA name. The merger was due to the similar interests and goals of the two separate organizations, which decided to unite as a way to gain more resources.  

The MLA holds conferences, where speakers and library employees find ways to better help the public and those that use the library for research. New technologies are showcased as the way of the future for libraries.

References 

 Metrolina Library Association Records, J Murrey Atkins Library, UNC Charlotte. 

Libraries in North Carolina